The British Rail Class 28 (Metro-Vick Type 2) diesel-electric locomotives, known variously as 'Metrovicks', 'Crossleys' or 'Co-Bos', were built under the Pilot Scheme for diesel locomotives as part of the British Railways 1955 Modernisation Plan. 

These Crossley-engined locomotives were one of two designs built under the Pilot Scheme to use two-stroke diesel engines, the other being the Class 23 'Baby Deltic' locomotives.

The locomotives had a Co-Bo wheel arrangement (a 6-wheel bogie at one end, a 4-wheel bogie at the other) – unique in British Railways practice and uncommon in other countries, although Japan also used some C-B diesel hydraulics.

Origin 
Work had begun on the Pilot Scheme in 1954 and the first plan for 174 locomotives (all classes) had been produced by October 1954, including 20 of these Metro-Vick Type B locos, although orders were not placed until November 1955. In July 1956 the Type A, B and C designations were changed to Types 1, 2 and 4, making this a Type 2.

The two-stroke engine was chosen as a comparison to the more common four-stroke engines used, and partly as a result of the influence of Oliver Bulleid. The leading manufacturer of such two-stroke locomotive engines was General Motors, but the national shortage of foreign exchange meant that imported engines were unaffordable. Crossley in Manchester had a suitable design in production as a generator set for the Admiralty and had also used it for a class of locomotives in Australia. Although Bulleid had left British railways and moved to Ireland and the CIÉ, he had been impressed by the Admiralty's experience of the Crossley diesel and had already ordered 60 similar locomotives, as the CIÉ's 001 class.

Engine
With low-speed Crossley 8-cylinder HST V8 two stroke engines, they represented an experiment in two stroke versus four stroke engines for diesel-electric traction.

The engines had exhaust pulse pressure charging and developed 1,200 horsepower (895 kW) at 625 rpm.  There were no valves, and inlet and exhaust were via ports in the cylinder walls.  The same engine was originally fitted in the Irish A Class and the Western Australian Government Railways X class. A similar, but smaller engine, the ESNT6 was used in the D3/3 shunters, an 08 with a Crossley engine rather than English-Electric.

Almost from the beginning, the Metrovick's Crossley engines were problematic. They suffered frequent failures and by 1961 the entire class was handed back to the manufacturer for remedial work on the engines and to cure problems with cab windows falling out while running. The cab windows were modified, such that instead of wrapping round to the side, the outer front windows were replaced by a flat piece of glass facing the front only.

The engines were also noisy and prone to unacceptable levels of smoky exhaust fumes.

Statistics
Total weight in working order was 97 long tons, distributed as shown in the table below. The units are tons, hundredweights and quarters.

{| class=wikitable
!
!colspan=3 |No. 1 end (Co)
!colspan=2 |No. 2 end (Bo)
!Total
|-
|In working order ||18-17-0 ||19-14-2 ||19-13-1 ||19-4-0 ||19-14-2 ||97-3-1
|-
|Empty ||18-0-2 ||18-4-0 ||18-2-3 ||18-0-0 ||18-4-0 ||90-11-1
|-
|Unsprung ||3-13-1 ||3-13-1 ||3-13-1 ||3-15-2 ||3-15-2 ||18-10-3
|}

Operation
All twenty Metrovicks were initially allocated to the Midland Division of BR's London Midland Region, where they were often used in pairs on the overnight London–Glasgow "Condor" express freight service. After the 1961 refurbishment they were all transferred to the Barrow-in-Furness 12E depot. They were withdrawn after only eleven years at work and in service. The allocation of all twenty locomotives in October 1967 was Carlisle Upperby.

Despite the electrical and mechanical equipment being reliable, the Crossley engines were still giving problems and British Rail considered replacing the engines, as was done with the Class 31 diesels and, later, with Crossley-engined locomotives in Ireland. A quotation was obtained by BR from English Electric for re-engining with an uprated version of the reliable 8SVT prime mover, already proven in the Class 20, and this was close to proceeding. However, the entire class, along with other small non-standard diesel classes, was withdrawn from service during 1967–68, and all but one were scrapped by the end of 1969. Their parts had been sold to make new metals by the end of 1971.

Preservation

A single locomotive, D5705, survived by historical accident, being renumbered S15705 and used from December 1968 by the Research Division for its Tribology Test train. It was superseded by a Class 24, and was used as carriage heating unit TDB968006 (based at Bath Road Depot, Bristol) before being preserved in 1985. Prior to this, it spent several years in a semi-protected siding on the line from Gloucester, just outside Swindon Station. It is currently on the East Lancashire Railway. The Class 15 Preservation Society has signed an agreement with the owners of D5705 to become its custodians during its restoration and operation for the next ten years, although funding will remain separate.

In fiction 
The Class 28 is the basis for BoCo, a character in The Railway Series children's books by the Rev. W. Awdry and the spin-off TV series Thomas and Friends. He carries the number D5702.

Models 
The Class 28 has been made as a 00 gauge model in several forms, including a ready-to-run version by Hornby Dublo. A ready to run model is being produced by Heljan on behalf of and exclusive to Hatton's Model Railways in Liverpool.  The Silver Fox Models model has now been withdrawn. As of November 2021, Rapido Trains UK have announced production of an N-scale model.

See also 
 EMD FL9, US contemporary of the Class 28, with B-A1A arrangement
 JNR Class DE10,  a Japanese diesel-hydraulic with C-B arrangement

References

Further reading

External links

 Images of TDB968006 at Bristol
 Co-Bo World
 Silver Fox Models (Class 28) – includes brief history of class and photo of model in rail blue livery

28
Metropolitan-Vickers locomotives
Co-Bo locomotives
Railway locomotives introduced in 1958
Standard gauge locomotives of Great Britain
Diesel-electric locomotives of Great Britain